Joan B. Gottschall (born April 23, 1947) is a senior United States district judge of the United States District Court for the Northern District of Illinois.

Education and career

Born in Oak Ridge Tennessee, Gottschall received a Bachelor of Arts degree from Smith College in 1969 and a Juris Doctor from Stanford Law School in 1973. She was then in private practice in Chicago, Illinois, until 1976, and again from 1978 to 1982, serving as a staff attorney of the Federal Defender Program in Chicago from 1976 to 1978. She was a staff attorney in the legal office of the University of Chicago from 1982 to 1984.

Federal judicial service

She was a United States Magistrate for the Northern District of Illinois from 1984 to 1996. On March 29, 1996, Gottschall was nominated by President Bill Clinton to a seat on the United States District Court for the Northern District of Illinois vacated by James Byron Moran. She was confirmed by the United States Senate on July 25, 1996, and received her commission on August 1, 1996. She took senior status on April 23, 2013, and was succeeded by Judge Sara L. Ellis.

References

External links

1947 births
Living people
Smith College alumni
Stanford Law School alumni
Judges of the United States District Court for the Northern District of Illinois
United States district court judges appointed by Bill Clinton
United States magistrate judges
People from Oak Ridge, Tennessee
20th-century American judges
21st-century American judges
20th-century American women judges
21st-century American women judges